Mark 23 Mod 0 (Mk.23 mod 0) may refer to:

 Heckler & Koch Mark 23, a semi-automatic .45ACP pistol
 Stoner 63, a 5.56×45mm NATO round light machine gun

See also
 Mark 23 (disambiguation)